Darren Clive Fichardt (born 13 May 1975) is a South African professional golfer who plays on both the European and Sunshine Tours.

Early life
Fichardt was born in Pretoria and grew up in Centurion, Gauteng. He attended Sutherland High School from 1988 to 1993, where his talent for golf was nurtured.

Professional career
Fichardt turned professional in 1994 and he won the Southern Africa Tour (now the Sunshine Tour) Order of Merit in 1999/2000 and 2003/04. He partnered Retief Goosen in South Africa's WGC-World Cup team in 2000.

Fichardt has played on the European Tour since 2001 and has won four European Tour events. His best year-end ranking on the Order of Merit is 39th achieved in 2003.

In 2012, Fichardt ended a nine-year title drought on the European Tour when he won the Saint-Omer Open by three strokes from Gary Lockerbie. This victory earned him his third European Tour title.

Fichardt followed this up in the 2013 season, when he won the Africa Open in his native South Africa in February. He claimed his fourth European Tour title by two strokes over Grégory Bourdy and Jaco van Zyl.

In February 2017, Fichardt won the weather-shortened Joburg Open for his fifth victory on the European Tour and seventeenth victory on the Sunshine Tour.

On 21 August 2020, Fichardt won the Betway Championship. This was the first event in return on the Sunshine Tour after the COVID-19 hiatus. He shot a final round 64 to beat Ulrich van den Berg by one shot.

Amateur wins
1992 Northern Transvaal Junior Championship (South Africa)
1993 Northern Transvaal Stroke Play Championship (South Africa)

Professional wins (23)

European Tour wins (5)

*Note: Tournament shortened to 54 holes due to weather.
1Dual-ranking event with the Challenge Tour
2Co-sanctioned by the Sunshine Tour

European Tour playoff record (1–1)

Sunshine Tour wins (18)

*Note: The 2017 Joburg Open was shortened to 54 holes due to bad weather.
1Co-sanctioned by the European Tour

Sunshine Tour playoff record (2–3)

Other wins (2)
1999 Sun City Pro-Am, PGA's Cup (both unofficial money on the Southern Africa Tour)

Results in major championships

CUT = missed the half-way cut
"T" = tied

Results in World Golf Championships

1Cancelled due to 9/11

"T" = Tied
NT = No tournament
Note that the HSBC Champions did not become a WGC event until 2009.

Team appearances
World Cup (representing South Africa): 2000

See also
2005 European Tour Qualifying School graduates
2011 European Tour Qualifying School graduates
2019 European Tour Qualifying School graduates

References

External links

South African male golfers
Sunshine Tour golfers
European Tour golfers
Sportspeople from Pretoria
White South African people
1975 births
Living people